The 2012 Kapisa airstrike refers to a NATO air raid in which seven children and one adult were killed in a village in Nijrab District of Kapisa Province, Afghanistan. The strike took place on 8 February 2012.

Events 
Kapisa district police chief Abdul Hamid Erkin told AFP: "Two nights ago foreign special forces carried out a raid on a house in Geyawa village in Nejrab district. ... The next morning their plane carried out an airstrike on a house in the village as a result of which seven children and one adult were martyred." He also said commanders of French troops "claimed that the target was a group of Taliban facilitators, but we checked the area and there were no Taliban. ...In fact the people in the area have very strong anti-Taliban feelings."

According to Hussain Khan Sanjani, the leader of the Kapisa provincial council: "the victims rounded up sheep and cows and moved them toward a mountainous area behind their homes," he said. "When they got cold, they gathered brush and lighted a fire to keep warm... One airstrike hit a large boulder and the other struck the victims, who were badly burned."

Investigation 
President Hamid Karzai had assigned a delegation "to launch an all-out probe into the NATO bombing in the province of Kapisa", a statement from his office said. He then sent an advisor, Mohammad Zahir Safi, to the area to investigate the incident.

Reactions 
President Hamid Karzai "strongly condemned an airstrike by foreign troops which resulted in the killing of a number of children,".

See also
Granai airstrike
Deh Bala wedding party bombing
Civilian casualties of the War in Afghanistan (2001–present)

References

External links 
NATO Air Strike Kills Eight Children in Afghanistan

2012 in Afghanistan
Mass murder in 2012
Airstrikes during the War in Afghanistan (2001–2021)
Civilian casualties in the War in Afghanistan (2001–2021)
History of Kapisa Province
February 2012 events in Afghanistan
Attacks in Afghanistan in 2012
2012 airstrikes